The Treason Act 1397 (21 Ric.2 c. 12) was an Act of the Parliament of England. It was supplemented by six other Acts (21 Ric.2 cc. 2, 3, 4, 6, 7 and 20). The seven Acts together dealt with high treason.

This legislation was passed during the final years of King Richard II's turbulent reign. The main Act (c.12) was a lengthy document setting out several new crimes which were to be treason. Another Act (c.3) confirmed that to "compasseth or purpose the death of the king, or to depose him," as well as the making of war against him in his realm, were treasonous acts. This act went further than the Treason Act 1351, which required that the offence be proved "of open deed." A third Act (c.4) also made it treason "to attempt to repeal any Judgments made by Parliament against certain traitors" (i.e. acts of attainder). A fourth Act (c.6) disqualified the sons of traitors from sitting in Parliament or the King's Council. A fifth Act (c.7) voided all "Annuities, Fees, Corodies, and all other Charges made or granted" by traitors after the date of the treason they were convicted of. A sixth Act (c.2) made it treason to set up any commission which was prejudicial to the king (this was in response to a commission of Lords Appellant which had been set up by Parliament in 1386, against Richard's will). The last Act (c.20) made it treason to "pursue to repeal any of these statutes."

The new treasons created by Richard were abolished by another Act passed in the first year of his successor, Henry IV (1399), which returned the law of treason to what it had been under the Treason Act 1351. This Act explained the reason for the repeal:

The jurist Sir William Blackstone wrote in his Commentaries on the Laws of England:

Detail of provisions

Chapter 3
21 Ric.2 c. 3 created four kinds of treason:
 to "compasseth or purposeth the Death of the King,"
 "or to depose him,"
 "or to render up his Homage or Liege,"
 "or [to] ... raiseth People and rideth against the King to make War within his Realm ..."
The Act declared that the procedure for prosecuting someone for any of these was by attainder in Parliament.

Chapter 12
21 Ric.2 c. 12 repealed everything done by the parliament of 1387 (11 Ric.2) and declared that the people who had been responsible for it were traitors. Moreover, it was declared to be treason for Parliament to impeach any of the king's officers without his consent, or for Parliament to continue to deliberate after the king dissolved it.

See also
High treason in the United Kingdom
Treason Act 1381 (another Act passed by Richard II)
Treason Act

References
 The Statutes of the Realm, vol. 2 (1816)

External links
 
 

Treason in England
Acts of the Parliament of England
1390s in law
1397 in England